The 1989 Embassy World Indoor Bowls Championship  was held at Preston Guild Hall, Preston, England, from 1 to 12 March 1989.
The event moved to the Preston Guild Hall from Alexandra Palace. Richard Corsie won the title beating Willie Wood in the final.

In the Pairs final David Bryant and Tony Allcock secured their third world title. The Pairs Championship was held alongside the Singles for the first time. There was no Women's event.

Winners

Draw and results

Men's singles

Men's Pairs

References

External links 
Official website

World Indoor Bowls Championship